Whipsnade is a small village and civil parish in the county of Bedfordshire, England. It lies on the eastward tail spurs of the Chiltern Hills, about 4.2 km south-south-west of Dunstable on the top of the Dunstable Downs which drop away steeply to the south of the village.

Etymology
Whipsnade is a compound of the Anglo-Saxon personal name, Wibba, with the word "snæd" an area of woodland, so the name means "Wibba’s wood". A variation may be seen as "Wystnade" in a legal record of 1460, where named people in Dunstable were accused of trespassing.

History
The village is first mentioned in a coroners roll of 1274 when Whipsnade Wood was described as being within the parish of Houghton Regis. The Old Hunters Lodge at the Crossroads in the village is a Grade II Listed Building and was built in the early 17th Century. It is now a hotel and is the only licensed premises in the village outside of the ZSL grounds.

Edward John Eyre, explorer of Australia, was born in Whipsnade in 1815.

The parish of Whipsnade used to have a detached part at Ballingdon Bottom, which formed an exclave of Bedfordshire, surrounded by Hertfordshire. The county boundary was changed in 1844, transferring Ballingdon Bottom to Hertfordshire, but for parish purposes it remained a detached part of Whipsnade. When district councils were established in 1894, the main part of Whipsnade parish was included in the Luton Rural District in Bedfordshire whilst Ballingdon Bottom became part of the Markyate Rural District in Hertfordshire. The parish boundaries were rationalised in 1897, when Ballingdon Bottom was transferred to the parish of Flamstead.

In the census of 2011 the population of Whipsnade was 420, a decline from 458 in 2001.

Landmarks
Whipsnade is home to Whipsnade Tree Cathedral and ZSL Whipsnade Zoo. A chalk image of a lion can be found on Bison Hill and is owned by the zoo. During the Second World War, the lion was covered with a black sheet in order not to attract attention from the German bomber planes. Whipsnade Park Golf Club is also in the vicinity, though it is actually in neighbouring Dagnall.

The local Wildlife Trust manages a small nature reserve north of the village called Sallowsprings.

References

External links

Villages in Bedfordshire
Civil parishes in Bedfordshire
Central Bedfordshire District